The Travyanka is a river in Perm Krai, Russia, a left tributary of the Veslyana, which in turn is a tributary of the Kama. Its source is near the border with the Komi Republic; it flows through the northwestern portion of the Gaynsky District of the krai.

References 

Rivers of Perm Krai